The Hoffmann 2CV Cabrio is a kitcar based on the Citroën 2CV.

In 1988, Wolfgang Hoffmann developed the design and the first prototypes. 
A lot of Hoffmann 2CV Cabrios have been built as a homework project. Approximately 250 professionally manufactured vehicles left the workshop in Hohenfurch. The kit contains a fibre glass reinforced plastic body with steel frame, two side windows, soft-top, trunk lid and all necessary screws, bolts, hinges etc. 

To this day approx. 1700 Hoffmann cabrios are registered in Europe, mainly in Germany and France. Some vehicles have also been sold to Japan and the USA.

The company is also producing spare parts for the Citroën 2CV, and other Citroën A-Types, like stainless steel chassis and fibre glass body parts.

References
AutoBild 36/1988
Der Spiegel 47/2011

External links 
Manufacturer's website

Kit cars
Citroën 2CV